Hakan Yakin (born 22 February 1977) is a Swiss football coach and a former player who played as a forward or midfielder. He is the manager of Schaffhausen. He was a member of the Swiss national team for eleven years.

Early and personal life
Yakin was born in Basel on 22 February, 1977, Switzerland, to Turkish parents. He grew up and went to school in suburban Münchenstein, Basel-Landschaft, just outside Basel, and close to the borders of France and Germany. He is the younger brother of international football player Murat Yakin, also a former member of the Swiss national football team, who currently works as a manager. His elder half-brother Ertan Irizik is also a former football professional. Yakin's surname is based on the Turkish word Yakın (meaning close, adjacent), however as he is a Swiss resident and citizen, the name which he uses is Yakin.

Club career
As a child Yakin played in the youth teams of his local side FC Concordia Basel. He signed his first professional contract with hometown club FC Basel in January 1995. He played his League debut for Basel on 12 April 1995 in the 1994–95 season in the match against Lausanne Sports. He was brought on in the 60th minute as replacement for Alexandre Rey and with his first touch of the ball, just 18 seconds later, he scored the goal to make it 3–0, a header (final score 5–0).

After two and a half years in Basel he transferred to Grasshopper Club Zürich, with manager Christian Gross, but could not establish himself, making most of his appearances as substitute, and he was loaned to FC St. Gallen for the second half of the 1997–98 season. He moved immediately into the starting eleven and so the loan was prolonged, before he returned to the Grasshoppers.

During January 2001 he transferred back to Basel. At the end of the 2001–02 season Yakin won the national Double with Basel and a year later won the Swiss Cup again. He recalls the 2002–03 Champions League Group B match on 12 November 2002 against Liverpool in St. Jakob-Park as the "match of his life". The game was drawn 3–3 and Yakin gave all three assists as Basel cruised to a 3–0 half-time lead as they qualified, one point above Liverpool, for the 2002–03 UEFA Champions League second group stage.

Curiosity during the championship play-off round of their 2002–03 season was, that in the home match in the St. Jakob-Park on 19 April 2003, Yakin had a good game and scored a perfect hat-trick during the first half of the game as Basel won 3–0 against Young Boys. Yakin showed his other side in the return match in the Stadion Neufeld in Bern one week later. As YB went a goal up he lost his temper and kicked the ball away, thus collecting a yellow card. Just ten minutes later he committed a rough foul and collecting a second yellow, thus yellow/red, to be sent-off.

His career was then overshadowed by some trouble regarding his club transfers, as his engagements outside Switzerland (Paris Saint-Germain, VfB Stuttgart, and Galatasaray) were not accompanied by luck. In 2005–06, Yakin returned to Switzerland, joining BSC Young Boys. In July 2008, Yakin signed a contract with Qatar champions Al-Gharafa, for a salary of around €2.5 million per year.

In March 2009, it was reported that Yakin had been training with the Grasshopper Club Zürich Under-21 side, coached by his brother Murat, in a bid to get fit. Yakin then signed a contract on 25 June 2009 in his homeland Switzerland with FC Luzern, running through to 30 June 2011. In summer 2011 his brother Murat became his manager at FC Luzern.

During the mid-season break in January 2012 Yakin transferred to AC Bellinzona in the Challenge League, the second tier of Swiss football. He played his team debut on 26 February in the 2–0 home win against Stade Nyonnais. He scored his first two goals for the club in the 3–2 away win against Aarau on 9 April 2012.

International career

Yakin was capped 87 times for Switzerland, the first coming in 2000. He was offered Turkish nationality before being called up to the Swiss squad, but turned it down for personal reasons. He has played in UEFA Euro 2004, UEFA Euro 2008, and both the 2006 FIFA World Cup and the 2010 FIFA World Cup with his country.

On 11 June 2008, he scored the opening goal in the 32nd minute of Switzerland's second Euro 2008 Group A match against Turkey, giving them a 1–0 lead and he refused to celebrate after the goal as a respect for his family's birth country. However, he missed another chance shortly afterward as Turkey scored two second-half goals, resulting in Switzerland's becoming the first team to be mathematically eliminated from their own tournament within five days of its beginning. However, in Switzerland's final group match against Portugal on 15 June, Yakin added two second-half goals, the second a penalty kick, to secure their first ever win at the UEFA European Championship, 2–0. Yakin finished the tournament as joint-second highest goalscorer with Lukas Podolski, Roman Pavlyuchenko, and Semih Şentürk with three goals each, behind David Villa's four goals.

Under new national team coach, Ottmar Hitzfeld, Yakin participated in seven of Switzerland's ten qualifying matches for the 2010 FIFA World Cup, starting twice, and making five substitute appearances, scoring one goal in Switzerland's opening qualifier against Israel. He announced his retirement from the Swiss national team on 4 October 2011.

Coaching career
He was hired as an assistant coach to his brother Murat at FC Schaffhausen in 2019. After Murat was hired as the manager of the Switzerland national football team in August 2021, Hakan served as a caretaker manager for Schaffhausen for 3 games. He returned to being assistant coach for the remainder of the season under Martin Andermatt. Together, they coached Schaffhausen to a second place finish in the 2021-22 Swiss Challenge League, but missed out on promotion in the promotion playoff. 

On 4 June 2022, he was confirmed as the new head coach at Schaffhausen, as Andermatt's contract was not renewed. This appointment is contingent on Yakin receiving his UEFA Pro Licence.

Career statistics

Club

International goals
Scores and results list Switzerland's goal tally first.

Managerial

Honours

Club
Grasshoppers
 Swiss Super League: 2000–01

Basel
 Swiss Super League: 2001–02
 Swiss Cup: 2001–02, 2002–03
 Uhrencup: 2003

Galatasaray
 Turkish Cup: 2004–05

Young Boys
 Uhrencup: 2007

Individual 
 Axpo Swiss Super League Player of the Year: 2003, 2008
 Swiss Super League top scorer: 2007–08 (24 goals)

Notes and references
References

External links

 
Profile at Swiss Football League Website 
Official Yakin brothers website 
 
123 Football profile

1977 births
2006 FIFA World Cup players
BSC Young Boys players
Expatriate footballers in Germany
Expatriate footballers in Qatar
FC Concordia Basel players
FC Basel players
FC St. Gallen players
Bundesliga players
Süper Lig players
Galatasaray S.K. footballers
Grasshopper Club Zürich players
Living people
Paris Saint-Germain F.C. players
Footballers from Basel
Swiss Super League players
Swiss Challenge League players
Swiss men's footballers
Switzerland international footballers
Swiss expatriate footballers
Swiss people of Turkish descent
UEFA Euro 2004 players
Al-Gharafa SC players
UEFA Euro 2008 players
VfB Stuttgart players
FC Luzern players
2010 FIFA World Cup players
AC Bellinzona players
Qatar Stars League players
Association football forwards
Association football midfielders
Swiss football managers
FC Schaffhausen managers
Swiss Challenge League managers